The XXII Tactical Air Command is an inactive United States Air Force unit.  Its last assignment was with Twelfth Air Force, at Pomigliano Airfield, Italy, where it was inactivated on 4 October 1945.

The command was formed in the southeast United States in early 1942. It moved to the United Kingdom in September 1942 and to North Africa during October–November 1942. Served in combat in the Mediterranean theater until the end of the war. Inactivated in Italy

Lineage
 Constituted as the 12th Interceptor Command on 26 February 1942
 Activated on 5 March 1942
 Redesignated 12th Fighter Command 15 May 1942
 Redesignated XII Fighter Command c. 24 September 1942
 Redesignated XXII Tactical Air Command in November 1944
 Inactivated on 4 October 1945
 Disbanded on 8 October 1948

Assignments
 Third Air Force, 5 March 1942
 Twelfth Air Force, 12 September 1942 – 4 October 1945 (attached to Eighth Air Force, 12 September-26 October 1942)

Stations

 Drew Field, Florida, 5 March-27 August 1942
 RAF Wattisham, England, 12 September 1942
 RAF Bushey Hall, England, 17 September-26 October 1942
 Oran Tafaraoui Airport, Algeria, 8 November 1942
 La Senia Airfield, Algeria, 12 November 1942
 Tebessa Airfield, Algeria, December 1942
 La Senia Airfield, Algeria, 12 January 1943
 Algiers, Algeria, 20 March 1943
 Caserta, Italy, 14 July 1944
 Florence Airfield, Italy, 15 September 1944
 Pomigliano Airfield, Italy, August-4 October 1945

Components
 Wings
 1st Air Defense Wing (later 62d Fighter Wing): 30 January 1943 – 12 September 1945
 2d Air Defense Wing (later 63d Fighter Wing): 27 January 1943 – 14 June 1945
 3rd Air Defense Wing: 22 February – 9 March 1943
 87th Fighter Wing: 11 January 1944 – 1 April 1945.

 Groups

 1st Fighter Group: 14 September – 24 December 1942
 14th Fighter Group: 14 September – 11 December 1942
 31st Fighter Group: 27 September – November 1942
 33d Fighter Group: 6 December 1942 – 13 January 1943
 47th Bombardment Group: 15 September 1944 – 7 June 1945
 52d Fighter Group: 14 September 1942 – 18 February 1943 (attached to Tunis Fighter Sector after c. 19 January 1943)
 79th Fighter Group: assigned 20 September 1944 – 1 October 1944 (attached to 64th Fighter Wing to 30 September 1944); attached 12 May – 7 June 1945
 86th Fighter Group: 15 September 1944 – 20 February 1945
 332d Fighter Group: 15 September 1944 – 20 February 1945

 Squadrons
 1st Emergency Rescue Squadron, 12 March − 1 October 1944 (attached to Mediterranean Allied Coastal Air Force after 14 September 1944)
 414th Night Fighter Squadron: 1 April – 7 June 1945
 417th Night Fighter Squadron: 1 April – 17 August 1945

References

Notes

Bibliography

 
 

22
Military units and formations disestablished in 1948